WOFX may refer to:

 WOFX (AM), a radio station (980 AM) licensed to Troy, New York, United States
 WOFX-FM, a radio station (92.5 FM) licensed to Cincinnati, Ohio, United States